A Triumph of the Heart: The Ricky Bell Story is a 1991 CBS made-for-TV movie that recounts the life of Ricky Bell, a Tampa Bay Buccaneers running back sickened with dermatomyositis, and Ryan Blankenship, a physically impaired child. The movie takes place during the 1981 Buccaneers season, including actual gameplay footage and a dramatized role played by Mario Van Peebles. Bell finds himself befriending an impaired child who inspire each other to become better in their own ways.

Cast
 Mario Van Peebles as Ricky Bell (including actual gameplay footage of the real Ricky Bell)
 Lane R. Davis as Ryan Blankenship
 Polly Holliday as Ruth Weidner
 Lynn Whitfield as Natala Bell
 Susan Ruttan as Carol Blankenship
 James Zachary as Lee Roy Selmon
 John Schumacher as Charley Hannah
 Duriel Harris as Danny Reece
 Dennis Letts as Ed Warren
 Woody Watson as Larry Blankenship
 Marcus Allen as himself
 Jay Pennison as Steve Wilson
 Doug Williams as himself (only through gameplay footage)

References

External links

American football films
CBS network films
Biographical films about sportspeople
Tampa Bay Buccaneers
Sports films based on actual events
Films based on biographies
Columbia Pictures films
Peabody Award-winning broadcasts
Cultural depictions of baseball players
1991 films
Films directed by Richard Michaels
1990s American films